In quantum chemistry, Brillouin's theorem, proposed by the French physicist Léon Brillouin in 1934, relates to Hartree–Fock wavefunctions. Hartree–Fock, or the self-consistent field method, is a non-relativistic method of generating approximate wavefunctions for a many-bodied quantum system, based on the assumption that each electron is exposed to an average of the positions of all other electrons, and that the solution is a linear combination of pre-specified basis functions.

The theorem states that given a self-consistent optimized Hartree–Fock wavefunction , the matrix element of the Hamiltonian between the ground state and a single excited determinant (i.e. one where an occupied orbital a is replaced by a virtual orbital r) must be zero.

This theorem is important in constructing a configuration interaction method, among other applications.

Another interpretation of the theorem is that the ground electronic states solved by one-particle methods (such as HF or DFT) already imply configuration interaction of the ground-state configuration with the singly excited ones. That renders their further inclusion into the CI expansion redundant.

Proof
The electronic Hamiltonian of the system can be divided into two parts. One consists of one-electron operators, describing the kinetic energy of the electron and the Coulomb interaction (that is, electrostatic attraction) with the nucleus. The other is the two-electron operators, describing the Coulomb interaction (electrostatic repulsion) between electrons.

One-electron operator

Two-electron operator

In methods of wavefunction-based quantum chemistry which include the electron correlation into the model, the wavefunction is expressed as a sum of series consisting of different Slater determinants (i.e., a linear combination of such determinants). In the simplest case of configuration interaction (as well as in other single-reference multielectron-basis set methods, like MPn, etc.), all the determinants contain the same one-electron functions, or orbitals, and differ just by occupation of these orbitals by electrons. The source of these orbitals is the converged Hartree–Fock calculation, which gives the so-called reference determinant  with all the electrons occupying energetically lowest states among the available.

For this transition, we apply the Slater–Condon rules and evaluate 

which we recognize is simply an off-diagonal element of the Fock matrix . But the reference wave function was obtained by the Hartree–Fock calculation, or the SCF procedure, the whole point of which was to diagonalize the Fock matrix. Hence for an optimized wavefunction this off-diagonal element must be zero.

This can be made evident also if we multiply both sides of a Hartree–Fock equation

It makes all the right-hand side of the equation zero:

which proves the Brillouin's theorem.

The theorem have also been proven directly from the variational principle (by Mayer) and is essentially equivalent to the Hartree–Fock equations in general.

References

Further reading 

 

 

Quantum chemistry
Theoretical chemistry